Highpoint is an unincorporated community located in Winston County, Mississippi.

References

Unincorporated communities in Winston County, Mississippi
Unincorporated communities in Mississippi